Emblemaria piratica, the sailfin signal blenny, is a species of chaenopsid blenny found from southern Mexico to Panama, in the eastern central Pacific ocean. It can reach a maximum length of  TL. This species feeds primarily on zooplankton.

References
 Ginsburg, I. 1942 (15 Dec.) Seven new American fishes. Journal of the Washington Academy of Sciences v. 32 (no. 12): 364–370.

piratica
Fish described in 1942
Taxa named by Isaac Ginsburg